Richard Charles Hardisty (3 March 1831 – 18 October 1889) was a Hudson's Bay Company official at Edmonton and a politician in the Northwest Territories, Canada.

He married Eliza McDougall on 21 September 1866 while he was a Hudson's Bay Company employee.

He ran as an Independent Conservative in the 1887 Canadian federal election and finished a close second in the Alberta (Provisional District). He lost to Donald Watson Davis.

He was appointed to the Senate of Canada on the advice of Prime Minister John A. Macdonald on 23 February 1888, the first Metis Senator. He died just a year later while fording a river on horseback on October 18, 1889. His replacement in the Senate was Sir James Lougheed, who would marry his niece Belle Hardisty in 1891, and the grandfather of Peter Lougheed.

The village of Hardisty, Alberta, is named in his honour, as is Mount Hardisty in Jasper National Park.

References

Further reading

External links

Biography at the Dictionary of Canadian Biography Online

1831 births
1889 deaths
Independent candidates in the 1887 Canadian federal election
Canadian senators from the Northwest Territories
Hudson's Bay Company people
Indigenous Canadian senators

Canadian Métis people